Shipwrecked: Battle of the Islands 2019 is a United Kingdom reality television series, part of the Shipwrecked franchise which originally aired on Channel 4's youth programming label T4 in different formats from 1999 until 2012. The 2019 series is the ninth series of Shipwrecked overall, and the fifth to adopt the "Battle of the Islands" format.

The series was confirmed by Channel 4 on 22 May 2018 with castaway auditions and filming for the series commencing in Summer 2018. It began airing on 28 January 2019, at 9pm on E4, and aired every weeknight for 15 episodes, concluding on 15 February 2019. The series was narrated by Vick Hope.

The series was the first series of Shipwrecked to air since Shipwrecked: The Island concluded on 31 January 2012 and the first revived series of the "Battle of the Islands" format since 2009.

The Tigers won against the Sharks sharing the £50,000 prize. On 15 July 2019, it was announced that the revived show had been axed due to low ratings.

The Game
Shipwrecked is a reality programme in which a number of people from the UK live on one of two islands (Shark Island and Tiger Island) for a period of several weeks. Each week, one or more new arrivals spend equal time on each island with the weekly beach party announcement where the new arrival will choose which island they wish to live on for the remainder of the competition.

At the end of the series, the island with the greater number of castaways wins, sharing the cash prize of £50,000.

Tribes

Departed Castaways

Eliminated Castaways
For this series there were numerous twists introduced to determine how castaways are eliminated from the competition. These twists included a tribal vote used in the first few episodes whilst subsequent episodes have introduced "duels" where two castaways face off against one another in a competition to remain on the island, and newcomers tasked to eliminate one (or more) players from competition.

Episodes

Reception
Reviewing the first episode, The Telegraph described it as "fiendishly watchable" and "smartly edited", though concluding "this felt like a backwards step. A throwback to the early days of reality TV - the likes of Castaway and Survivor - not to mention a transparent bid to cash in on Love Island's success. In Shipwrecked’s favour, at least the casting was more diverse in terms of ethnicity, sexuality and social class. And this lot also possessed more brain cells than most of ITV2’s villa-dwellers."

References

External links
 Official website

British reality television series
2019 British television seasons
Channel 4 reality television shows
E4 (TV channel) original programming